The Government Ministries of Thailand ( are the government agencies that compose the executive branch of the Government of Thailand. Each ministry is headed by a minister of state and, depending on the prime minister, several deputy ministers ( . The combined heads of these agencies form the Cabinet of Thailand. There are 19 ministries. The combined employees of these departments make up the civil service of Thailand.

Ministries

History
During the Rattanakosin Period, the kingdom's administration was similar to that of the Ayutthaya Period. There were two chief ministers (: the first running military affairs or samuhakalahom (and the second Samuhanayok ( for civilian affairs. The civilian ministry was divided further into four kroms (headed by a senabodi ( or 'minister'. This type of administration was called the Chatusadom ( :

Rama V reforms
King Chulalongkorn (Rama V), who had received a European education and traveled widely, reformed the administration of the state. In 1875, he issued a royal decree to bring about this reform, dividing and creating many departments, and thereby preventing the archaic system from collapsing.

The administrative reforms of Chulalongkorn created six ministries (each headed by a minister of state or :

A further four were soon added:

By 1900 the entire structure was formed. The ten ministries became the center of Siamese government and rule. After the 1932 Revolution, most of the ministries were retained by the Khana Ratsadon, however from then on the ministers were chosen by the prime minister and not the king.

See also
 Cabinet of Thailand
 Independent agencies of the Thai government
 Government of Thailand
 List of state enterprises of Thailand
 Politics of Thailand
 Prime Minister of Thailand

References

External links 
Official webpage
 Reshaping Thailand through Bureaucratic Reform and Development
 The History of Thailand's Administration Website of the Department of Provincial Administration – DOPA (in English) ( Internet archive of 25 November 2009)

Government of Thailand
 
M
Lists of government ministries